SV Süden Forst was a German football club from Forst (Lausitz).

History 

The team was established 4 May 1907 as Turn- und Sportverein Süden Forst. They joined the Arbeiter-Turn- und Sportbund (ATSB or Workers' Gymnastics and Sports Federation) in 1919 and made two appearances in the league final after claiming the regional Ostdeutschland title. In 1920, they beat TSV Cassel-Waldau 5–1 in a semi-final match-up before losing to Tuspo Fürth 2–3 in the final. In 1926, they advanced to the final past TSV St. Leonhardt-Schweinau (2–0), where they dropped a 1–5 decision to DSV 1910 Dresden. The club was active until 1933 when worker's sports clubs were banned as politically undesirable under the Third Reich. After 1933, the club merges with VfB 1901 Forst (founded 1901 as FC Hohenzollern Forst) to SpVgg Forst and plays in the second division of Gauliga Berlin-Brandenburg. The club was dissolved 1945.

After World War II, the club was re-established as Sportverein Süden Forst before East German authorities renamed it SG Einheit Forst. Through most of the 1960s and 1970s they were a third-division side, before slipping to fourth-tier play in the 1980s. The club's name reverted to SV after German reunification in 1990 and in 2011 announced a merger with Rot-Weiß 90 Forst to form SV Lausitz Forst. with the new club playing in the Kreisoberliga.

Honours 
The club's honours:
 Ostdeutscher ATSB 
 Champions: 1919, 1926
 ATSB 
  Vice-champions: 1919, 1926

References

External links 
 SV Süden Forst 

Suden
Defunct football clubs in Germany
Defunct football clubs in Brandenburg
German workers' football clubs
Association football clubs established in 1907
1907 establishments in Germany
Association football clubs disestablished in 2011
2011 disestablishments in Germany
Football clubs in Germany